Brokstedt station is a railway station in the municipality of Brokstedt, located in the Steinburg district in Schleswig-Holstein, Germany.

References

Railway stations in Schleswig-Holstein